Western false front architecture or false front commercial architecture is a type of commercial architecture used in the Old West of the United States.  Often used on two-story buildings, the style includes a vertical facade with a square top, often hiding a gable roof.

The goal for the architecture is to project an image of stability and success, while in fact a business owner may not have invested much in a building that might be temporary.  Four defining characteristics have been suggested:
 the front façade of the building "rises to form a parapet (upper wall) which hides most or nearly all of the roof"
 the roof "is almost always a front gable, though gambrel and bowed roofs are occasionally found"
 "a better grade of materials is often used on the façade than on the sides or rear of the building" and
 "the façade exhibits greater ornamentation than do the other sides of the building."

The N. P. Smith Pioneer Hardware Store in Bend, Oregon is an example where the owner ran a store or other business on the ground floor and lived upstairs.  There were many false front buildings constructed in the Bend, Oregon, area between 1900 and 1910.  However, the Smith hardware store is the only surviving example in downtown Bend.

References

External links

 
Architectural styles